Simo Boltić (born 29 November 1994 in Backa Palanka) is a Serbian sprint canoer.
He won a silver medal at Canoe Sprint European Championships, in K-2 500 m, with Marko Dragosavljević.

When he was junior, he won one medal at the European Junior Championships, gold in K-2 500 m, with Marko Dragosavljević,

Simo is a member of the Sintelon canoe club in Bačka Palanka.

References

1994 births
Living people
Serbian male canoeists
People from Bačka Palanka
Canoeists at the 2015 European Games
European Games competitors for Serbia
Competitors at the 2013 Mediterranean Games
Mediterranean Games competitors for Serbia
21st-century Serbian people